Ljosland Chapel is a parish church of the Church of Norway in Åseral Municipality in Agder county, Norway. It is located in the village of Ljosland. It is one of the churches for the Åseral parish which is part of the Otredal prosti (deanery) in the Diocese of Agder og Telemark. The brown, wooden church was built in a long church design in 1959 using plans drawn up by the architect Olav Erikstad. The church seats about 95 people.

See also
List of churches in Agder og Telemark

References

Åseral
Churches in Agder
Wooden churches in Norway
20th-century Church of Norway church buildings
Churches completed in 1959
1959 establishments in Norway